Wernyhora is a legendary 18th century Cossack bard (bandurist)  the fall of Poland and its subsequent rebirth and flourishing, "from Black to White sea".

He has been a subject of several folklore tales and poems (particularly in the 19th  century romanticism in Poland). Most notably he has been a character in works of Seweryn Goszczyński (Vernyhora), Michał Czajkowski (Wernyhora wieszcz ukraiński: powieść historyczna z roku 1768 (1838)), Juliusz Słowacki and Stanisław Wyspiański (The Wedding), as well as a subject of a paintings by Jan Matejko and Jacek Malczewski.

References

Geoffrey A. Hosking, George Schöpflin, Myths and nationhood, Taylor & Francis, 1997, Google Print, p.148

Zaporozhian Host
Ukrainian artists